José Wallenstein (born 18 October 1959) is a Portuguese actor. He appeared in more than ninety films since 1981.

Selected filmography

References

External links
 
 

1959 births
Living people
Male actors from Lisbon
Portuguese male film actors
Portuguese male television actors
Portuguese people of German descent
Jose